Mathews is a census-designated place (CDP) in and the county seat of Mathews County, Virginia, United States. Established around 1700, the small town of Westville was designated as the county seat in 1791.  Today, it is variously known as Mathews Court House, as well as simply "Mathews," its official postal name.

References

Census-designated places in Mathews County, Virginia
County seats in Virginia
Virginia populated places on the Chesapeake Bay